The Discovery Bay Marine National Park is a protected marine national park located in the Western District of Victoria, Australia The  marine park is located near , and extends along  of coastline on the western side of Cape Bridgewater, from Cape Duquesne to Blacks Beach, and offshore  to the limit of Victorian waters.

The Discovery Bay Coastal Park protects the adjacent coastline.

See also

 Protected areas of Victoria

References

External links

Marine parks in Victoria (Australia)
Coastline of Victoria (Australia)
Ramsar sites in Australia
Parks of Barwon South West (region)